Kirk Cashmere (1955 – December 2, 2002) was a prominent civil rights attorney who helped make same-sex marriage a major issue in Hawaii, as well as a historian and pioneer of organized Judaism in the state. Born in Milwaukee, Wisconsin, his family moved to Hawaii when he was 5 years old. He attended the Iolani School and earned a degree in Near Eastern and Judaic studies at Brandeis University.

After studying Law at the University of Hawaii, he served as legal director for the ACLU, worked with the Legal Aid Society of Hawaii and the Life Foundation, and was a member of the state's Ethics Committee. As a member of the "Governor's Committee on HIV/AIDS," he played a central role in formulating policy that would at once protect the public from unsafe exposure and maintain the confidence of carriers.

External links
Kirk Cashmere - Honolulu Star-Bulletin Obituary

1955 births
2002 deaths
Lawyers from Milwaukee
Hawaii lawyers
Brandeis University alumni
University of Hawaiʻi alumni